The Chinese Ambassador to Ivory Coast is the official representative of the People's Republic of China to Ivory Coast.

List of representatives

See also
China–Ivory Coast relations

References 

Ambassadors of China to Ivory Coast
Ivory Coast
China